Lia Purpura (born February 22, 1964, Mineola, New York) is an American poet, writer and educator. She is the author of four collections of poems (King Baby, Stone Sky Lifting, The Brighter the Veil, It Shouldn't Have Been Beautiful), four collections of essays (Increase, On Looking, Rough Likeness, and All the Fierce Tethers) and one collection of translations (Poems of Grzegorz Musial: Berliner Tagebuch and Taste of Ash).  Her poems and essays appear in AGNI,<ref>[http://www.bu.edu/agni/authors/L/Lia-Purpura.html AGNI Online: Author Lia Purpura]</ref> The Antioch Review, DoubleTake, FIELD, The Georgia Review, The Iowa Review, Orion Magazine, The New Republic, The New Yorker, The Paris Review, Parnassus: Poetry in Review, Ploughshares. Southern Review, and many other magazines.

Life
A graduate of Oberlin College and the Iowa Writers' Workshop where she was a Teaching/Writing Fellow in Poetry, Lia Purpura is currently Writer-in-Residence at University of Maryland, Baltimore County in Baltimore, Maryland. She is also on the faculty of the Rainier Writing Workshop Low-Residency MFA Program in Tacoma, Washington. Recent visiting appointments include visiting faculty at the Bread Loaf Writers' Conference, the Bedell Visiting Writer at the University of Iowa's MFA Program in Nonfiction; Coal Royalty Visiting Professor at the University of Alabama's MFA Program; Reader/Lecturer at the Bennington Writing Program, and Visiting Writer at the Warren and Patricia Benson Forum on Creativity at Eastman School of Music.  She lives in Baltimore with her husband, conductor Jed Gaylin, and their son.

Awards
In 2012, Lia Purpura was awarded a Guggenheim Fellowship.King Baby (poems, Alice James Books, 2008) won the Beatrice Hawley Award and was a finalist for the Foreword Magazine Book of the Year Award and the Maine Literary Award.On Looking (essays, Sarabande Books, 2006) was a finalist for the National Book Critics Circle Award and the winner of the Towson University Prize in Literature.Increase (essays, University of Georgia Press, 2000) won the Associated Writing Programs Award in Creative Nonfiction.Stone Sky Lifting (poems, Ohio State University Press, 2000) won the OSU Press/The Journal Award.The Brighter the Veil (poems, Orchises Press, 1996) won the Towson University Prize in Literature.

Her recent essays "On Coming Back as a Buzzard", "Glaciology" and "The Lustres" were awarded Pushcart Prizes in 2011, 2009 and 2007, and other essays were named "Notable Essays" in Best American Essays, 2004, 2005, 2007, 2008, and 2009.

Lia Purpura is also the recipient of a National Endowment for the Arts Fellowship, a Fulbright Award Fellowship (translation, Warsaw, Poland), multiple residences at the MacDowell Colony, and a grant from the Maryland State Arts Council.

Discography

Collaborations

 The Poulenc Trio:  Creation, featuring Lia Purpura, poet, (Delos/Naxos, 2016)

Bibliography

Essays
 
 
 
 

Poetry

Collections
 King Baby (Poems) Alice James Books, 2008, 
 Stone Sky Lifting (Poems) Ohio State University Press, 2000, 
 The Brighter the Veil (Poems) Orchises Press, 1996, 
 It Shouldn't Have Been Beautiful'' (Poems) Penguin Press, 2015,

Translations
  (Translation)

List of poems

Awards and honors
 2012: Guggenheim Fellowship in General Nonfiction
 2009: Towson University Prize in Literature
 2007: Beatrice Hawley Award
 2004: NEA Literature Fellowship in Prose
 2000: Associated Writing Programs Award in Creative Nonfiction
 2000: Ohio State University Press/The Journal Award

References

Sources
 Alice James Books > Author Page > Lia Purpura

External links
 NEA Writer's Corner: Lia Purpura
 Audio: Wired for Books > Lia Purpura
 Interview with Lia Purpura by Margaret MacInnis
 Interviews > Smartish Pace > An Interview with Lia Purpura > by Laura Klebanow
Guggenheim Fellowship
Bookslut:  Interview by Noah Charney
When Beauty Stretches:  Apercu Quarterly
The Journal: Ohio State University Interview
WYPR Maryland Morning.  Interview with Tom Hall
WYPR Maryland Morning :  Rough Likeness
Sarabande Books:  "Author Speaks"

1964 births
Living people
Iowa Writers' Workshop alumni
Loyola University Maryland faculty
Oberlin College alumni
The New Yorker people
American women poets
20th-century American poets
20th-century American women writers
21st-century American poets
21st-century American women writers
20th-century American translators
21st-century American translators
American women essayists
University of Maryland, Baltimore County faculty
University of Iowa faculty
University of Alabama faculty
Eastman School of Music faculty
People from Mineola, New York
Poets from New York (state)
20th-century American essayists
21st-century American essayists
Women music educators
American women academics